Running Water may refer to:

Places
 Running Water, Tennessee, the former name of Whiteside, Tennessee
 Running Water, South Dakota, a census-designated place
 Running Water Draw, a river in Texas
 Running Water Stage Station, a former stop on a stage coach route in Wyoming

Entertainment
 Running Water (film), a 1922 British silent film
 Running Water (novel), a 1906 novel by A.E.W. Mason
 "Running Water", a song by the Moody Blues from their 1983 album The Present
 "Running Water", a song by Daniel Johnston from his 1983 album Hi, How Are You

Other uses
 Running Water (horse), an American Thoroughbred racemare

See also 
 
 Drinking water
 Massacre of Running Waters
 Tap water
 Water supply